John W. Ames may refer to
John W. Ames (politician) (1793–1833), American politician 
John W. Ames (colonel) (1833–1878), Union Army colonel